Anna Cecilia Björk (born 12 March 1970 in Trollhättan) is a Swedish actress. Now she works at the Royal Dramatic Theatre.

Selected filmography
1989 - Flickan vid stenbänken (TV)
1993 - Chefen fru Ingeborg (TV)
1996 - Rusar i hans famn
1997 - In the Presence of a Clown (TV)
1999 - Jakten på en mördare (TV)
2003 - Illusive Tracks
2004 - Four Shades of Brown
2005 - Harrys döttrar
2006 - Varannan vecka
2006 - Inga tårar
2007 - Gynekologen i Askim (TV)
2008 - LasseMajas detektivbyrå – Kameleontens hämnd
2019 - ''Quicksand (Netflix Series)

References

External links

Swedish Film Database

Living people
People from Trollhättan
1970 births
Swedish stage actresses
Swedish film actresses
Swedish television actresses